Robert Dawson (31 January 1935 – 1980) was an English footballer who played as a full back.

Dawson started his career with non-league South Shields before joining Leeds United in 1953. After only making 1 first team appearance, Dawson moved to Gateshead in 1955, where he scored 1 goal in 121 league and cup games. Dawson also had a trial spell at Manchester City in 1951.

Sources

References

1935 births
1980 deaths
Footballers from South Shields
English footballers
Association football defenders
South Shields F.C. (1936) players
Leeds United F.C. players
Gateshead F.C. players
English Football League players